Khachapuri ( khach’ap’uri   from   "curds" +   "bread") is a traditional Georgian dish of cheese-filled bread. The bread is leavened and allowed to rise, molded into various shapes, and then filled in the center with a mixture of cheese (fresh or aged, most commonly, specialized Khachapuri cheese), eggs, and other ingredients. The bread crust is traditionally torn off and dipped into the cheese.

It is very popular in Georgia, both in restaurants and as street food. As a Georgian staple food, the price of making khachapuri is used as a measure of inflation in different Georgian cities by the "khachapuri index," developed by the International School of Economics at Tbilisi State University. It is Georgia's national dish, inscribed on the list of the intangible cultural heritage of Georgia. On the behalf and initiative of the Gastronomic Association of Georgia, the 27th of February was announced as National Khachapuri Day, to celebrate Georgia's signature pastry as well as to promote its recognition internationally.

History 
Specialists are divided regarding the chronology of the khachapuri.

Indeed, according to Darra Goldstein who wrote The Georgian Feast about the dish, khachapuri probably dates back to the 12th century when Georgia experienced a renaissance period but its specific root remains unclear.

Dali Tsatava, former professor at the Georgian Culinary Academy, suggested that khachapuri could be a "cousin of the pizza" as the concept of the dish might have been brought by Roman soldiers who crossed Europe in the 16th century.

Types 
There are several distinctive types of khachapuri from different regions of Georgia:
 Imeretian (Imeruli) khachapuri is the most popular form, made with a yeast dough filled with white Imeretian salted cheese.
 Adjarian (Acharuli/Adjaruli/Lazi), named by Adjara, a region of Georgia on the Black Sea is a boat-shaped khachapuri, with cheese, butter, and an egg yolk in the middle. Traditionally, tangy imeruli and sulguni cheeses are used.
 Megrelian khachapuri (Megruli) is similar to Imeretian, but has more cheese added on top.
 Achma, from Abkhazia, has multiple layers and looks rather like a sauceless lasagna.
 Gurian (Guruli) khachapuri has chopped boiled eggs inside and looks like a crescent-shaped calzone. Gurians make them for Christmas and call them simply "Christmas pie." In the rest of Georgia, it is called "Gurian pie."
 Ossetian (Osuri) khachapuri has potato and cheese as its filling. It is commonly called khabizgini.
 Svanuri lemzira
 Rachuli khachapuri
 Samtskhe–Javakhetian penovani khachapuri is made with cheese-filled puff pastry dough, resulting in a flaky variety of the pie.

Example of basic recipe for an Imeretian khachappuri 
Ingredients for the dough

 200 g flour
 50 ml water
 40 ml milk
 10 ml oil
 1 tsp yeast
 1 egg

Ingredients for the cheese 

 1 egg
 30 g butter
 400 to 500 g cheese

Cheese preparation

In a bowl, mix the grated cheese, egg and 30g of butter.

Prepare the dough

 Stir the yeast into the warm water
 Pour the flour into a dish, make a well in the middle and pour in the water and yeast, oil, milk and egg.
 Mix until you have a dough.

Form the dough into a ball. Put it in a bowl, cover with plastic film and leave in a warm place for at least 2 hours.

Then knead the dough, smooth it into a circle and spread the cheese mixture in the center.

Close the edges on top and flatten again. 

Bake in the oven for 15 minutes at 180°C.

Outside Georgia 
Khachapuri is popular in the post-Soviet states, including Russia. It was reported that 175,000 khachapuris were consumed during the 2014 Winter Olympics in Sochi. Khachapuri is a popular street food in Armenia, where it is widely served in restaurants and school cafeterias. It has become increasingly popular as a brunch food in Israel, where it was brought over by Georgian Jews.

See also 

 Banitsa
 Burek
 Cantiq
 Egg in the basket
 Grilled cheese
 Lafa
 Naan
 Pastrmajlija
Peinirli
 Piadina
 Pirog
 Pizza
 Vatrushka
 Puri
 Roti canai

References

External links 

 Revolution of khachapuri
 Recipe at RecipeSource
 Recipe at New York Times
 
 

Cheese dishes
Cuisine of Georgia (country)
Cuisine of New York City
Flatbread dishes
Georgian products with protected designation of origin
Israeli cuisine
Russian cuisine
National dishes
Savoury pies
Street food